Wickedness Preferred is a lost 1928 American silent comedy film, directed by Hobart Henley, and written by Colin Clements, Robert E. Hopkins and Florence Ryerson. The film stars Lew Cody, Aileen Pringle, Mary McAllister, Bert Roach, and George K. Arthur. The film was released on January 28, 1928, by Metro-Goldwyn-Mayer.

Cast
Lew Cody as Anthony Dare
Aileen Pringle as Kitty Dare
Mary McAllister as Babs Burton
Bert Roach as Homer Burton
George K. Arthur as Leslie
Rosebud Binkley (uncredited)
Julia Griffith as Dowager (uncredited)

References

External links

1928 films
1920s English-language films
Lost American films
Silent American comedy films
1928 comedy films
Metro-Goldwyn-Mayer films
Films directed by Hobart Henley
American black-and-white films
American silent feature films
Films with screenplays by Florence Ryerson
1928 lost films
Lost comedy films
1920s American films